Kyünçal (also, Kyunchal) is a village in the Davachi Rayon of Azerbaijan.  The village forms part of the municipality of Çaraq.

References 

Populated places in Shabran District